Nazareth College is a census-designated place (CDP) and the official name for an area covering the Nazareth College campus, in Monroe County, New York, United States. 

It first appeared as a CDP in the 2020 Census with a population of 1,182.

Demographics

2020 census

Note: the US Census treats Hispanic/Latino as an ethnic category. This table excludes Latinos from the racial categories and assigns them to a separate category. Hispanics/Latinos can be of any race.

References

Census-designated places in Monroe County, New York